Clear Springs Plantation, also known as Dawson Place and Green's Thoroughfare, is a historic plantation house located near Jasper, Craven County, North Carolina.  It was built about 1740, and is a -story, five bay by two bay, Georgian style frame dwelling. It may be the oldest standing structure in Craven County and probably one of the oldest in North Carolina.

It was listed on the National Register of Historic Places in 1973.

References

Plantation houses in North Carolina
Houses on the National Register of Historic Places in North Carolina
Georgian architecture in North Carolina
Houses completed in 1740
Houses in Craven County, North Carolina
National Register of Historic Places in Craven County, North Carolina
1740 establishments in North Carolina